Timeless Tales for Changing Times is a 1998 album by jazz saxophonist Joshua Redman. Many of the tracks featured pay tribute to the composers listed in parentheses. This is his sixth album for Warner Bros.

Reception
Bill Milkowski of JazzTimes commented "Even when Joshua puts soprano to his mouth and wanders dangerously close to Kenny G territory on Joni Mitchell’s “I Had a King,” he is saved by Blade’s hip time displacement and Meldhau’s unorthodox voicings, which tweak Redman just enough to bypass the road to sapville. Blade helps jazz up Bob Dylan’s “The Times They Are A-Changin'” with nimble, swinging cymbal and snare statements while Meldhau makes like a jazzy Glenn Gould on this invention. A strong frontman aided immensely by a brilliant band." Jeff Simon of The Buffalo News commented, "It's a smart, pleasant standards disc by a younger player who has done better before and will again."

Track listing
 "Summertime" (George Gershwin)
 "Interlude 1" (Joshua Redman)
 "Visions" (Stevie Wonder)
 "Yesterdays" (Jerome Kern)
 "Interlude 2" (Joshua Redman)
 "I Had a King" (Joni Mitchell)
 "The Times They Are a-Changin'" (Bob Dylan)
 "Interlude 3" (Joshua Redman)
 "It Might as Well Be Spring" (Rodgers-Hammerstein)
 "Interlude 4" (Joshua Redman)
 "How Deep is the Ocean" (Irving Berlin)
 "Interlude 5" (Joshua Redman)
 "Love For Sale" (Cole Porter)
 "Interlude 6" (Joshua Redman)
 "Eleanor Rigby" (Lennon-McCartney)
 "Interlude 7" (Joshua Redman)
 "How Come U Don't Call Me Anymore?" (Prince)

Personnel
 Joshua Redman – Tenor Saxophone
 Brad Mehldau – Piano
 Larry Grenadier – Bass
 Brian Blade – Drums

References

External links
 

Joshua Redman albums
1998 albums